Monoptilon (desertstar) is a small genus of annual plants in the tribe Astereae within the family Asteraceae.

They are native to North America.

 Species
 Monoptilon bellidiforme Torr. & A.Gray ex A.Gray (daisy desertstar) - CA NV AZ UT
 Monoptilon bellioides  (A.Gray) H.M. Hall (Mojave desertstar) - - CA NV AZ Baja California, Sonora

References

Astereae
Asteraceae genera
North American desert flora
Taxa named by Asa Gray
Taxa named by John Torrey